Triazoledione (developmental code name BMS-180492) is a phenylpiperazine compound and a major metabolite of the antidepressant nefazodone. It is active, but with substantially reduced potency compared to nefazodone (approximately one-seventh). As such, it has been suggested that it is unlikely that triazoledione contributes significantly to the pharmacology of nefazodone. However, triazoledione may reach concentrations as great as 10 times those of nefazodone, and hence could still be a significant contributor to its therapeutic effects.

Pharmacology

Triazoledione shows significant affinity for the serotonin 5-HT1A and 5-HT2A receptors, the α1-adrenergic receptor, and the histamine H1 receptor. It shows negligible affinity for the serotonin and norepinephrine transporters and the muscarinic acetylcholine receptors.

See also
 Serotonin antagonist and reuptake inhibitor

References

5-HT1A agonists
5-HT2A antagonists
Alpha-1 blockers
Antidepressants
Chloroarenes
H1 receptor antagonists
Human drug metabolites
meta-Chlorophenylpiperazines
Triazoles